Adelante Andalucía was an electoral alliance formed by Podemos Andalusia, United Left/The Greens–Assembly for Andalusia, Andalusian Left and Andalusian Spring to contest the 2018 Andalusian regional election. The latter two parties were created in the wake of the dissolution of the Andalusian Party.

After announcing their intention to leave Podemos in February 2020, Teresa Rodríguez and the rest of the ex-Podemos parliamentarians affiliated with Anticapitalistas were subject to an expulsion from their parliamentary group in October 2020. The party was eventually refounded as a left-wing nationalist organisation in June 2021.

History 
In 2017, Podemos Andalusia and United Left/The Greens–Assembly for Andalusia (IULV-CA) began to work on a joint roadmap in the Andalusian Parliament. The plan involved acting as a strong opposition to the PSOE of Andalusia and the President of the Andalusian Regional Government, Susana Díaz. The coalition began to take shape in March and April 2018, with talks on running together in the following elections. The talks were joined by the ecologist party Equo as well as various Andalusian nationalist parties, such as Andalusian Spring and Andalusian Left. The coalition was officially presented in June 2018, holding its first event in the city of Córdoba.

Throughout the month of September 2018, the coalition published the makeup of its electoral lists. Teresa Rodríguez was elected to represent the province of Málaga, occupying first place on the list. Meanwhile, Antonio Maíllo, the general coordinator of IULV-CA, would be in first place on the list of candidates for Seville.

After announcing their intention to leave Podemos in February 2020, Teresa Rodríguez and the rest of the ex-Podemos parliamentarians were expelled from their parliamentary group in October 2020.

Composition

Electoral performance

Parliament of Andalusia

References

Notes

2018 establishments in Andalusia
2020 disestablishments in Spain
Andalusian nationalist parties
Defunct left-wing political party alliances
Defunct political party alliances in Spain
Defunct socialist parties in Spain
Podemos (Spanish political party)
Political parties disestablished in 2020
Political parties established in 2018
Political parties in Andalusia
Andalusia
United Left (Spain)